The Fusil Automático Doble (English: Double Automatic Rifle) is a Peruvian bullpup assault rifle designed by Peruvian arms designer Salomón Braga Lozo and manufactured by SIMA Electrónica.

Due to its simplicity and light weight, it is used in the Peruvian Army as a secondary weapon. The country was originally intending on purchasing 580,000 AN-94 assault rifles to replace the HK33 already in service, but ended up settling on the FAD due to its price.

History and development 

The weapon, designed by Salomón Braga Lozo in 2008, began production the same year by the manufacturer SIMA Electrónica, a subsidiary of SIMA (Servicio Industrial de la Marina), a branch of the Peruvian Navy, located in the port of Callao. It is Peru's first rifle, and is still in service to this day. Each unit costs about 800 to 1200 USD, allowing for mass manufacturing. It is intended to be phased out by a successor, the FAD-V2.

Since it has only been manufactured for use in Peru, the weapon has only seen action in Peru's internal conflict, mostly in the VRAEM region of the Peruvian jungle. Otherwise, the rifle only sees use in military bases or national parades.

Description 

 The FAD is made from stamped sheet steel and polymer, incorporating a modern grip, but lacks a full trigger guard, utilizing the cocking handle of its 40mm grenade launcher to prevent any accidental trigger contact. At the top of the handguard there is the sight of the grenade launcher and an M1913 rail to mount various optical sights, allowing the attachment of different sights, such as night vision, or holographic sights, among others. The magazine is inserted from below with a slight tilt to the left, the ejection is carried out on the right side, and the spent casings are ejected directly downwards, which allows the FAD to be used by right and left handed users without the need for modifications. The mechanisms are activated by direct recoil of the bolt. It has a fire selector and can fire in semi-automatic and automatic mode.

In popular culture
The weapon is featured in Call of Duty: Modern Warfare 3.

See also
 FN F2000

References 

Bullpup rifles
Weapons of Peru
Assault rifles
5.56×45mm NATO firearms